Saman (also Romanized as Sāmān) is a city in the Central District of Saman County, Chaharmahal and Bakhtiari province, Iran, and serves as capital of the county. At the 2006 census, its population was 14,777 in 3,961 households. The following census in 2011 counted 15,327 people in 4,558 households. The latest census in 2016 showed a population of 14,192 people in 4,554 households. The city is populated by Turkic people with a Persian minority.

References 

Saman County

Cities in Chaharmahal and Bakhtiari Province

Populated places in Chaharmahal and Bakhtiari Province

Populated places in Saman County